Keith Ferguson (born February 26, 1972) is an American voice actor. He is known for his voice work as Bloo from Foster's Home for Imaginary Friends, Basch fon Ronsenburg from Final Fantasy XII, Marluxia from Kingdom Hearts, Lord Hater from Wander Over Yonder, Lord Saladin from Destiny and Destiny 2 and Reaper from Overwatch. He also provides a number of sound-alike portrayals, including Harrison Ford as Han Solo and Indiana Jones on Robot Chicken and Owen Wilson as Lightning McQueen in the Cars franchise.

Career
After studying theatrical performance and creative writing at the University of the Pacific and University of Southern California, Ferguson worked behind the scenes in daytime television production while occasionally finding time to perform in local theatre productions and improvisation groups.

Towards the end of his production career, he actively began his pursuit of a career in voice-over. In 1999, while working on what would turn out to be his last full-time position in television production, a voice-over agent named Pat Brady, after discovering Ferguson the week prior in a voice-over workshop in Toluca Lake, California, and before even officially signing with him for representation, sent him out on what would be his first professional voice-over audition (a sound-alike for Keanu Reeves in a 60-second radio spot satirizing The Matrix for the former Hollywood Video movie-rental franchise). He ended up booking the role from this first VO audition, after which he officially signed with Pat Brady who, through two talent agencies, would continue to represent him to this day.

In 2000, he gained his first experience in animation voice-over alongside Rob Paulsen and David Sobolov having booked the role of Ray on a former, somewhat obscure CGI-animated web-series entitled Li'l Green Men featured on Warner Bros. former website "Entertaindom." After the next 3 years while building up his voice-over repertoire with various roles in commercial spots, video games, animation and sound-alike voice-matching for various films, he would be cast in one of the first of his more notable roles being that of Bloo in Foster's Home for Imaginary Friends created by The Powerpuff Girls animator Craig McCracken. This was accompanied by other notable performances such as General "Thunderbolt" Ross in the animated series The Avengers: Earth's Mightiest Heroes, Friend Owl in the feature Bambi II, as well as his recurring portrayal as Harrison Ford's Han Solo and Indiana Jones in Robot Chicken along with the Star Wars parodies. He reprised his voice role as Han Solo in the 2014 film The Lego Movie.

Amidst further various vocal appearances in animation, a few of which include credits on Family Guy, Adventure Time, Phineas and Ferb, Codename: Kids Next Door, The Grim Adventures of Billy and Mandy, Legion of Super Heroes, and Harvey Birdman, Attorney at Law, Ferguson also found a role in Cars Toons: Mater's Tall Tales subbing for Owen Wilson as Lightning McQueen.

Ferguson has also done voice work in video games; notable roles include Basch fon Ronsenburg in Final Fantasy XII, Gabranth in Dissidia Final Fantasy and Dissidia 012 Final Fantasy and Number XI Organization XIII member Marluxia in Kingdom Hearts Re:Chain of Memories.

Ferguson was also vocally featured as two differently styled race-announcers in two TV commercials for the sports beverage, Vitamin Water; one featuring race-car driver Carl Edwards with Ralph Macchio paying homage to his role in The Karate Kid, and the other a Super Bowl ad featuring Shaquille O'Neal as an unlikely victorious horse-race jockey.

Personal life

Ferguson's mother is a retired probate estate specialist whilst his father was a concert pianist who was one of Southern California's most popular piano men until his death in 1999.

Filmography

Film

Animation

Video games

References

External links

 
 
 Keith Ferguson at VoiceChasers.com

Living people
20th-century American male actors
21st-century American male actors
American male film actors
American male television actors
American male video game actors
American male voice actors
University of the Pacific (United States) alumni
University of Southern California alumni
African-American male actors
Cartoon Network people
20th-century African-American people
21st-century African-American people
1972 births